The Granatspitze Group, sometimes also the Granatspitz Group, is a sub-group of the Central Alps within the Eastern Alps. Together with the Ankogel Group, the Goldberg Group, the Glockner Group, the Schober Group, the Kreuzeck Group, the Venediger Group, the Villgraten Mountains and the Rieserferner Group, the  Granatspitze Group forms the main range known as the High Tauern. The Granatspitze Group is located in Austria in the federal states of Salzburg and Tyrol. Its highest summit is the Großer Muntanitz, 

The Granatspitze Group is located in the central part of the High Tauern. The Felbertauernstraße road is the boundary of the group in the west. The group is rather overshadowed by its more famous neighbours which include the Großglockner and the Großvenediger. The range takes its name from the Granatspitze,

Neighbouring ranges 

The Granatspitze Group is bordered by the following other mountain ranges of the Alps:

 Kitzbühel Alps (to the north)
 Glockner Group (to the east)
 Schober Group (to the southeast)
 Villgraten Mountains (to the southwest)
 Venediger Group (to the west)

Summits 

All named three-thousanders (main peaks in the Granatspitze Group):

 Großer Muntanitz 
 Kleiner Muntanitz 
 Oberer Muntanitzpalfen 
 Luckenkogel 
 Stubacher Sonnblick 
 Granatspitze 
 Vordere Kendlspitze 
 Hintere Kendlspitze 
 Kalser Bärenkopf 
 Gradötz 
 Stellachwand 
 Grauer Schimme 
 Wellachköpfe 
 Äußerer Knappentröger

References

Sources 
 Georg Zlöbl: Die Dreitausender Osttirols im Nationalpark Hohe Tauern. Verlag Grafik Zloebl, Lienz-Tristach 2007, 

 
Geography of East Tyrol
Zell am See District
Mountain ranges of Salzburg (state)
Mountain ranges of Tyrol (state)